Anabarilius goldenlineus is a species of ray-finned fish in the genus Alburnus.

References

goldenlineus
Fish described in 1995